Marcelo Fabián Suárez Campos (born February 12, 1970 in Montevideo, Uruguay) is a former Uruguayan footballer who played for clubs of Uruguay, Chile, Mexico and Colombia.

Teams
  Progreso 1989-1995
  Central Español 1996
  Venados de Yucatán 1996
  Rentistas 1997
  Unicosta de Barranquilla 1998
  River Plate 1999
  Huachipato 2000
  Liverpool 2001
  Deportes Puerto Montt 2002
  Everton de Viña del Mar 2003
  Deportes La Serena 2004
  Unión La Calera 2004
  San Marcos de Arica 2005-2007
  La Luz 2008-2009

Titles
  Progreso 1989 (Uruguayan Primera División Championship)
  Deportes Puerto Montt 2002 (Chilean Primera B Championship)

References
 
 

1971 births
Living people
Uruguayan footballers
Uruguayan expatriate footballers
Central Español players
C.A. Rentistas players
C.A. Progreso players
Club Atlético River Plate (Montevideo) players
Liverpool F.C. (Montevideo) players
San Marcos de Arica footballers
Deportes La Serena footballers
Unión La Calera footballers
C.D. Huachipato footballers
Puerto Montt footballers
Uruguayan Primera División players
Primera B de Chile players
Chilean Primera División players
Expatriate footballers in Chile
Expatriate footballers in Mexico
Expatriate footballers in Colombia
Association football forwards
Rocha F.C. managers
Rampla Juniors managers